Dennis Lam Shun-chiu, JP (born 26 November 1959) is a prominent Hong Kong ophthalmologist, businessman and politician. He has been a Hong Kong deputy to the National People's Congress (NPC) since 2008 and a member of the Election Committee.

Biography
Lam was born in Hong Kong on 26 November 1959 and was educated at the King's College and was graduated from the University of Hong Kong with a Bachelor of Medicine and Bachelor of Surgery in 1984 and became a Fellow of the Hong Kong Academy of Medicine. He became chairman of the Department of Ophthalmology and Visual Sciences at the Chinese University of Hong Kong since 1998.

He founded the C-MER Eye Care Holdings and became the company's chairman and chief executive. By 2017, C-MER Eye Care had eight ophthalmologists in Hong Kong and 24 physicians at Shenzhen hospital which brought him more than HK$80 million revenue in 2016.

He was awarded Ten Outstanding Young Persons Selection of Hong Kong in 1994 and Ten Outstanding Young Persons of the World in 1995. He was first elected to the Election Committee through the Medical Subsector in 1998 and was elected again in 2006. In the 2008 election, he was elected as Hong Kong deputy of the National People's Congress (NPC) in 2008 and became an ex officio member of the Election Committee since 2008. He was picked as one of the torchbearers in the 2008 Summer Olympics torch relay in Hong Kong.

During the historic 2019 pro-democracy protests, Lam and few hundreds Hong Kong doctors and nurses signed a letter expressing support for the Hong Kong Police Force's crackdown on the protesters, as a counter campaign against a group of medical workers staged a protest against the police brutality.

Lam first ran in the Legislative Council election in 2000 in the Medical functional constituency but was defeated by Lo Wing-lok. He became one of the 51 candidates running in the 40-seat Election Committee in the newly overhauled 90-seat Legislative Council of Hong Kong in the 2021 election.

Though Hong Kong medical schools teach in English, Lam in July 2022 criticized the requirement that English be the language of instruction for a program that recruits doctors from medical schools outside of Hong Kong.

Personal life
He married Li Xiaoting, a participant of the 2004 Miss Chinese International Pageant who is 19 years younger than him.

On 5 January 2022, Carrie Lam announced new warnings and restrictions against social gathering due to potential COVID-19 outbreaks. One day later, it was discovered that Lam attended a birthday party hosted by Witman Hung Wai-man, with 222 guests. At least one guest tested positive with COVID-19, causing all guests to be quarantined. Lam was warned by Legislative Council president Andrew Leung to not attend any meetings until after finishing his last mandatory COVID-19 test on 22 January 2022. However, he decided to attend the meeting on 19 January 2022, against Leung's orders.

In November 2022, he tested positive for COVID-19.

References

1959 births
Living people
Alumni of King's College, Hong Kong
Alumni of the University of Hong Kong
Academic staff of the Chinese University of Hong Kong
Delegates to the 11th National People's Congress from Hong Kong
Delegates to the 12th National People's Congress from Hong Kong
Delegates to the 13th National People's Congress from Hong Kong
Delegates to the 14th National People's Congress from Hong Kong
HK LegCo Members 2022–2025
Hong Kong justices of the peace
Hong Kong ophthalmologists
Hong Kong pro-Beijing politicians
Members of the Election Committee of Hong Kong, 2000–2005
Members of the Election Committee of Hong Kong, 2007–2012
Members of the Election Committee of Hong Kong, 2012–2017
Members of the Election Committee of Hong Kong, 2017–2021
Members of the Election Committee of Hong Kong, 2021–2026